Some Velvet Morning is a 2013 American drama film directed by Neil LaBute and starring Alice Eve and Stanley Tucci.

Plot summary
Set entirely inside a rowhouse located in Brooklyn, New York City, and taking place in real time featuring a cast of only two people: a middle-aged lawyer named Fred (Stanley Tucci) surprises his beautiful young mistress Velvet (Alice Eve) by arriving at her doorstep after four years, claiming to have finally left his wife. After she rejects his attempts to rekindle their romance, his persistence evolves into obsession. As tensions rise, a dark history between the former lovers comes into focus.

Initially Velvet tries to get Fred to leave by claiming that she has another appointment with Fred's son, Chris. During Fred and Velvet's discussions, Velvet reveals that she was, and is currently still, working as a high-priced escort whom Fred met on one of his many business trips.  Their talk eventually leads to a string of arguments over their relationship. The fight leads to violence as Fred forces himself upon Velvet and rapes her before walking out.

The climactic twist comes when Fred returns and both he and Velvet break character by revealing how they enjoyed play acting the entire scene. It turns out that 'Fred' is just one of Velvet's regular clients and they meet regularly to act out Fred's different fantasies. Fred pays Velvet for her services as well as some extra money for overstaying the hour.  When Velvet expresses her wish to play a role other than escort in their future encounters and suggests that maybe she can be a nurse, he says that he'll play the patient.  As he leaves, Velvet asks Fred to promise that he'll call her to schedule their next appointment.

Cast
 Stanley Tucci as Fred
 Alice Eve as Velvet

Reception
The film received mixed reviews upon release, with Jason Di Rosso from ABC Australia saying that the audience was "treated with utter contempt by the director and his accomplices". Chuck Bowen of Slant Magazine wondered "why LaBute was ever taken seriously as a so-called dramatist of the gulf between the sexes" and called the film a "prolonged exercise in resentful gender stalemating", giving it half a star out of five.

Currently, the film holds a 54% on Rotten Tomatoes, from 37 reviews. Christy Lemire, writing for Roger Ebert's website, felt it represented a "return to the kind of writing and filmmaking with which Neil LaBute made his name" and awarded it 3 stars out of 4.

References

External links
 
 

2013 films
American drama films
Films directed by Neil LaBute
2013 drama films
Films shot in New York City
Two-handers
2010s English-language films
2010s American films